Along Came Love is a 1936 American comedy film directed by Bert Lytell and written by Arthur Caesar. The film stars Irene Hervey, Charles Starrett, Doris Kenyon, H. B. Warner, Irene Franklin and Bernadene Hayes. The film was released on November 6, 1936, by Paramount Pictures.

Cast 
Irene Hervey as Emmy Grant
Charles Starrett as John Patrick O'Ryan
Doris Kenyon as Mrs. Gould
H. B. Warner as Dr. Martin
Irene Franklin as Mrs. Minnie 'Goldie' Grant
Bernadene Hayes as Sarah Jewett
Ferdinand Gottschalk as Mr. Vincent
Charles Judels as Joe Jacobs
Frank Reicher as Planetarium Lecturer
Mathilde Comont as Customer
Baby Edward as Baby Edward

References

External links 
 

1936 films
American comedy films
1936 comedy films
Paramount Pictures films
American black-and-white films
1930s English-language films
1930s American films